Taylor Creek is a stream in Boone County, Kentucky, United States. It is a tributary of the Ohio River.

Taylor Creek has the name of Rev. John Taylor, a pioneer citizen.

The ruins of USS Phenakite lies abandoned in Taylor Creek.

See also
List of rivers of Kentucky

References

Rivers of Boone County, Kentucky
Rivers of Kentucky